Glenn Jones (born September 27, 1962 in Jacksonville, Florida) is an American R&B/soul singer. He is best known for his songs "Show Me", "We've Only Just Begun (The Romance Is Not Over)" and "Here I Go Again", which reached No. 1 on the Billboard R&B charts in 1991/1992 as well as the track "I've Been Searching (Nobody Like You)".

Career
Jones started his career as a gospel singer, working and recording with the Florida-based gospel group, the Modulations, before managing a successful move into the R&B field. He got his recording start in R&B in 1980 when Norman Connors featured the singer on a track, "Melancholy Fire" on his album, Take It to the Limit. The song was released as a single, climbing to No. 20 on the Billboard R&B chart.

Jones toured with Connors, and in 1983 he signed a deal with RCA. In the same year, he issued a five-track mini-album Everybody Loves a Winner that had the top 30 R&B single, "I Am Somebody". His first full-length album, Finesse, was released in 1984. The single "Show Me," reached No. 3 on the R&B charts. The second single, "Bring Back Your Love" reached No. 18 on the R&B charts.

He started recording for his third RCA album in 1985; Take It from Me was released the following year. The album's title track was featured in the movie, Youngblood.

Moving to Jive in 1987, Jones scored a hit with "We've Only Just Begun" which reached No. 2 on the Billboard magazine R&B chart. The track was the lead single from the album Glenn Jones, released in 1987.

His last album on Jive was All for You which peaked on the R&B album charts at No. 27. "Can We Try Again" and the title track were produced by a then-less well known producer by the name of Teddy Riley.

In 1991, Jones moved to Atlantic Records. During the same year, Jones released the album, Here I Go Again. Its first single, "Here I Go Again", was his only single to reach No. 1 on the R&B charts. The second single, "I've Been Searchin' (Nobody Like You)" was also successful, peaking at No. 8 R&B. His album Here I Am was released in 1994 and had a minor hit with the ballad "Round and Round", which reached No. 24 on the R&B charts.

In 1993, British girl group Eternal covered Jones's 1990 track "Stay" and released it as their debut single, reaching No. 4 in the UK and No. 19 in the US Billboard charts.

Jones released the album It's Time in 1998 and Feels Good (Peak Records) in 2002, neither of which were very successful on the charts.

Discography

Studio albums

With the Modulations

Compilations

Singles

Other charted songs

References

External links
Glenn Jones Myspace Page

Glenn Jones 2012 Audio Interview at Soulinterviews.com

1962 births
Living people
American gospel singers
American rhythm and blues singers
American male singers
Musicians from Jacksonville, Florida
Atlantic Records artists
RCA Records artists
Jive Records artists
American soul singers